The Colton antigen system (Co) is present on the membranes of red blood cells and in the tubules of the kidney and helps determine a person's blood type. The Co antigen is found on a protein called aquaporin-1 which is responsible for water homeostasis and urine concentration.

The Co antigen is important in transfusion medicine. 99.8% of people possess the Co(a) allele. Individuals with Co(b) allele or who are missing the Colton antigen are at risk for a transfusion reaction such as hemolytic anemia or alloimmunization. Antibodies against the Colton antigen may also cause hemolytic disease of the newborn, in which a pregnant woman's body creates antibodies against the blood of her fetus, leading to destruction of the fetal blood cells.

References 
  OMIM entry for the Colton antigen

External links 
 Colton at BGMUT Blood Group Antigen Gene Mutation Database at NCBI, NIH

Blood antigen systems
Transfusion medicine
Genes on human chromosome 7